Rugby is an unincorporated community in Grayson County, Virginia.

References

Unincorporated communities in Virginia
Unincorporated communities in Grayson County, Virginia